The Albanian local elections of 2011 took place on 8 May 2011 in Albania. Electors were asked to elect their municipality's mayor, municipal council members, municipal unit mayor, and municipal unit members. The elections were administrated by the Central Election Commission of Albania. Only 9 of the 384 winning candidates were women.

Parties and coalitions 
The two coalitions taking part in the 2011 local elections were the Coalition of the Citizen formed by the Democratic Party of Albania and Coalition for the Future formed by the Socialist Party of Albania.

Process 

In total, 7882 voting centers in the country opened at 7:00 am and closed at 8:00 pm. The voter turnout countrywide was about 50.9%.

Tirana election

Polls 
The Socialist Party-led Coalition of the Future published a poll that predicted the electoral victory of Edi Rama in Tiranë, while TV Klan, an Albanian private channel published a poll of the Gani Bobi Institute predicting a victory of Lulzim Basha.

Voting process 
The counting process lasted 6 days and was marked by mutual stalls from parties involved, and the intervention of most prominent foreign Ambassadors accredited to the country for moving the process forward. On 14 May 2011, after the last ballot box determining the result for the Tirana election was counted, it revealed that Edi Rama, the Coalition for the Future candidate was ahead by only 10 votes from Lulzim Basha, the candidate of the Coalition for the Citizen. Thus, the pre-eliminary result pointed to Edi Rama as the winner of the Tirana Mayoral election. The tally was awaiting final certification by the KQZ.

Recount and final decision 

The latter declared that ballots inserted on the wrong ballot boxes should have been counted as well. Indeed, voters were asked to elect local city, and municipal unit mayors as well. Thus, KQZ overrode local KZAZ's decisions and started to count all invalid ballots cast on the wrong ballot boxes. The final tally revealed that Lulzim Basha won the Tirana race by 81 votes more than Edi Rama. Thus, the winner for the Tirana mayoral chair was declared to be Lulzim Basha. Edi Rama filed an appeal at the Electoral College to overthrow the result and re-instate the 14 May tally that pointed to him as the winner of the election. All instances rejected Rama's appeal, and on 25 July 2011 Lulzim Basha was sworn in as the new Mayor of Tirana.

Turnout percentages 

The voter turnout in the municipalities (bashki) was:

Bajram Curri 58%
Ballsh 55%
Berat 41%
Bilisht 63%
Bulqizë 62%
Burrel 57%
Çorovodë 61%
Delvinë 41%
Durrës 42%
Elbasan 47%
Ersekë 52%
Fier 42%
Gramsh 55%
Gjirokastër 46%
Kamëz 55%
Kavajë 40%
Koplik 51%
Korçë 45%
Krujë 62%%
Krumë 73%
Kukës 65%
Laç 49%
Lezhë 48%
Librazhd 58%
Lushnje 49%
Peqin 56%
Përmet 50%
Pogradec 47%
Pukë 68%
Rrëshen 56%
Sarandë 39%
Shkodër 39%
Tepelenë 58%
Tiranë 53.01%
Vlorë 41%

Results

Berat County

Dibër County

Durrës County

Elbasan County

Fier County

Gjirokastër County

Korçë County

Kukës County

Lezhë County

Shkodër County

Tiranë County

Vlorë County

Countrywide results for Municipal Assemblies 
Number of votes and percentage for each subject countrywide.

Reactions 
Sali Berisha, prime minister and leader of the Democratic Party of Albania, declared that the elections went well.
The Organization for Security and Co-operation in Europe declared the electoral system needs immediate reforms.

Partial Elections 

Partial elections were held in September and November 2013 for mayors of the following communes: Korçë in Korçë District, Dardhas in Korçë District, Rrethina in Shkodër District, and Karbunarë in Lushnje District.

See also 
Coalition for the Future
Coalition for the Citizen
Politics of Albania
Parliamentary Elections of 2013
Partial Local Elections of 2013

External links 
 Results in Real Time
 Central Election Commission
 Balkan Insight, Albania 2011 Local Elections: Key Facts, 13 April 2011
 Albania, Local Elections, 8 May 2011: Preliminary Statement, OSCE-ODIHR Accessed 27 May 2011

References 

2011 elections in Europe
Local elections
2011
May 2011 events in Europe